Bagijan (also Romanized as Bagījān; also known as Gījān, Ganjān, Giniān, and Ginjān) is a village in Chenaran Rural District, in the Central District of Chenaran County, Razavi Khorasan Province, Iran. At the 2006 census, its population was 19, in 5 families.

See also 

 List of cities, towns and villages in Razavi Khorasan Province

References 

Populated places in Chenaran County